Donald Blake may refer to:

 Donald Blake, the fictional doctor identity of the Marvel Comics character Thor
 Donald R. Blake, American chemist